Albion is a city in Cassia County, Idaho, United States. It is part of the Burley, Idaho Micropolitan Statistical Area. The population was 234 at the 2020 census. Albion was the county seat of Cassia County from 1879 to 1918.

Albion is one of the few cities in the Magic Valley region of Idaho founded before 1900. Beginning in 1893 it was home of the Albion State Normal School, which trained many Idaho teachers. The school was closed in 1951 and its teaching programs were transferred to Idaho State College (now Idaho State University) in Pocatello. By 2006 the campus had fallen into serious disrepair.

History
The first settlement at Albion was made ca. 1875. The city was named for Albion, the poetic name for Great Britain.

D. L. Evans Bank was founded in Albion in 1904. Although the bank's headquarters is now located in Burley, it continues to operate a branch in Albion.

Geography
Albion is located at  (42.410882, -113.580901).

The college was later opened by the Church of Christ as Magic Valley Christian College. This was a part of Pepperdine College in California.

Notable people
 Harold B. Lee (1899-1973) - educator, American religious leader
Stephen Montague (1943-) - classical composer, lived in Albion as a child 1947 to 1951

Climate

Demographics

2010 census
As of the census of 2010, there were 267 people, 113 households, and 73 families residing in the city. The racial makeup of the city was 96.3% White, 3.0% from other races, and 0.7% from two or more races. Hispanic or Latino of any race were 4.5% of the population.

There were 113 households, of which 26.5% had children under the age of 18 living with them, 55.8% were married couples living together, 5.3% had a female householder with no husband present, 3.5% had a male householder with no wife present, and 35.4% were non-families. 29.2% of all households were made up of individuals, and 11.5% had someone living alone who was 65 years of age or older. The average household size was 2.36 and the average family size was 2.99.

The median age in the city was 42.8 years. 25.1% of residents were under the age of 18; 8.6% were between the ages of 18 and 24; 18.7% were from 25 to 44; 29.3% were from 45 to 64; and 18.4% were 65 years of age or older. The gender makeup of the city was 50.9% male and 49.1% female.

2000 census
As of the census of 2000, there were 262 people, 108 households, and 65 families residing in the city. The racial makeup of the city was 99.24% White, 0.76% from other races. Hispanic or Latino of any race were 2.67% of the population.

There were 108 households, out of which 30.6% had children under the age of 18 living with them, 55.6% were married couples living together, 3.7% had a female householder with no husband present, and 38.9% were non-families. 30.6% of all households were made up of individuals, and 13.9% had someone living alone who was 65 years of age or older.  The average household size was 2.43 and the average family size was 3.12.

In the city, the population was spread out, with 28.6% under the age of 18, 1.9% from 18 to 24, 22.5% from 25 to 44, 28.2% from 45 to 64, and 18.7% who were 65 years of age or older.  The median age was 43 years. For every 100 females, there were 103.1 males.  For every 100 females age 18 and over, there were 105.5 males.

The median income for a household in the city was $42,375, and the median income for a family was $40,000. Males had a median income of $43,125 versus $23,750 for females. The per capita income for the city was $24,259.  About 10.3% of families and 10.2% of the population were below the poverty line, including 12.9% of those under the age of eighteen and 4.2% of those sixty five or over.

Education
The city is served by the Cassia County School District.

The city is zoned to:
 Albion Elementary School

References

Cities in Cassia County, Idaho
Cities in Idaho
Burley, Idaho micropolitan area